The polar effect or electronic effect in chemistry is the effect exerted by a substituent on modifying electrostatic forces operating on a nearby reaction center. The main contributors to the polar effect are the inductive effect, mesomeric effect and the through-space electronic field effect.

An electron-withdrawing group (EWG) draws electrons away from a reaction center. When this center is an electron rich carbanion or an alkoxide anion, the presence of the electron-withdrawing substituent has a stabilizing effect.

Examples of electron withdrawing groups are
 halogens (F, Cl);
 nitriles CN;
 carbonyls RCOR';
 nitro groups NO2.
 
An electron-releasing group (ERG) or electron-donating group (EDG) releases electrons into a reaction center and as such stabilizes electron deficient carbocations. 

Examples of electron releasing groups are
 alkyl groups;
 alcohol groups;
 amino groups.

The total substituent effect is the combination of the polar effect and the combined steric effects.

In electrophilic aromatic substitution and nucleophilic aromatic substitution substituents are divided into activating groups and deactivating groups where the direction of activation or deactivation is also taken into account.

References

External links
 Polar effect definition by the IUPAC Gold Book

Physical organic chemistry